State Route 338 (SR 338) is a secondary highway located entirely within Sevier County in East Tennessee. The road runs generally south–north although like most roads in East Tennessee it has numerous winding turns.

Route description

SR 338 begins at an intersection with US 441/US 411/SR 35/SR 71 in Seymour. It winds its way northeast as Boyds Creek Highway to pass through Boyds Creek before entering Sevierville and coming to an intersection with SR 66. SR 338 turns south and becomes concurrent with SR 66 to pass through a business district before leaving SR 66 and turning northeast onto Douglas Dam Road and leaving Sevierville. It continues northeast through farmland to pass through Alder Branch, where it becomes Old State Highway 66, before turning north and crossing the French Broad River just west of the Douglas Dam. SR 338 then continues north to come to an end at an intersection with SR 139.

Major intersections

References

338